Lucius Cassius Hemina (2nd centuryBC) was a Roman historian.

Life
Little is known of his life. He apparently composed his annals in the period between the death of Terence and the revolution of the Gracchi.

Work
L. Cassius Hemina is principally known for his Annals or History of Rome, which were composed in Latin and comprised four books.

Hemina's annals include the earliest account concerning the bravery of G. Mucius Scaevola. He also described the arrival in Rome of the Greek physician Archagathus.

The fragments of Hemina's works have been edited by Peter in Historicorum Romanorum Fragmenta and more recently in a separate edition with commentary by Carlo Santini.

See also
 Annals & Annalists

References

Latin historians
Hemina, Lucius
Cassius Hemina
2nd-century BC Romans
Year of death unknown
Year of birth unknown